Hokkien mee, literally "Fujian noodles", is a series of related Southeast Asian dishes that have their origins in the cuisine of China's Fujian (Hokkien) province.

Types
Hokkien mee can refer to four distinct dishes, with each being ubiquitous in specific localities in Singapore, Malaysia and Indonesia.  The dishes are all indigenous to the region and not known in Fujian itself, although they are all thought to have descended from lor mee (卤面), a staple of Fujianese cooking.

Hokkien mee 

In Singapore, Hokkien mee refers to a dish of egg noodles and rice noodles stir-fried with egg, slices of pork, prawns and squid. The key to the dish is copious quantities of an aromatic broth made from prawns and pork bones, slowly simmered for many hours.  Sambal chilli and calamansi limes are served on the side for the diner to blend in, giving it an extra zing and tanginess. Traditionally, small cubes of fried lard are added, and some stalls also serve the dish on an opeh leaf (soft areca palm bark), which enhances the fragrance of the dish.

The Singaporean version of Hokkien mee was created after World War II by Chinese sailors from Fujian (Hokkien) province in southern China. After working in the factories, they would congregate along Rochor Road and fry excess noodles from the noodle factories over a charcoal stove. The dish is considered a classic of Singaporean cuisine and several hawker stalls selling it have been recognized by the Michelin Guide.

The dish is also known as "fried Hokkien noodles" (炒福建面), "Hokkien fried prawn noodles" (福建炒虾面), and particularly in Malaysia, "sotong mee" (squid noodles) to differentiate it from other types of Hokkien mee.

In Indonesia, Mie Hokkien is associated particularly with the city of Medan on Sumatra.  While the ingredients resemble the Singaporean version, instead of being stir-fried together, the ingredients are typically cooked separately and simply tossed together before serving.

Penang hae mee (noodle soup) 

The Penang variant can be easily distinguished from the other variants by its characteristic spicy prawn broth. It primarily consists of rice vermicelli and thicker yellow egg noodles, while the broth is made with prawn heads and shells, and pork ribs. Sliced prawns are also added into the dish, along with pork slices, hard boiled eggs, kangkung (Ipomoea aquatica), bean sprouts, fried shallots, lard and sambal. In Penang, pig skin, an ingredient rarely served in Kuala Lumpur, is a common topping as well.

Egg noodles are served in richly flavoured dark soup stock with prawns, pork slices, fish cake slices and bean sprouts, topped with fried shallots and scallion. The stock is made using dried shrimp, plucked heads of prawns, white pepper, garlic and other spices. Traditionally, lard is added to the soup, but this is now less common due to health concerns. A "dry" (without soup) version is also available; this version usually involves flavouring the noodles and toppings with vinegar, soy sauce, oil and chili, if desired. The dish is also usually served with freshly cut red chili slices in light soy sauce and lime juice.

Singaporean hae mee

Another version also called "prawn noodles" in Singapore is similar to the Penang variation of Hokkien mee. Egg noodles and rice noodles are served in richly flavoured dark soup stock with prawns, pork slices, fish cake slices, and bean sprouts topped with fried shallots and spring onion. The stock is made using dried shrimps, prawn heads, white pepper, garlic and other spices.

Hokkien char mee 

Hokkien char mee (Hokkien fried noodles) is served in Kuala Lumpur and the surrounding region. It is a dish of thick yellow noodles braised in thick dark soy sauce with pork, squid, fish cake and cabbage as the main ingredients and cubes of pork fat fried until crispy (sometimes pork liver is included). The best examples are usually cooked over a raging charcoal fire. This dish originated from a hawker stall chef, Ong Kim Lian, at Petaling Street in 1927. Unlike the other variants of Hokkien mee, this dish does not incorporate prawns.

See also

 Malaysian cuisine
 Singaporean cuisine
 List of noodle dishes
 Rice noodles

References

Further reading
 

Chinese noodle dishes
Fried noodles
Malaysian noodle dishes
Noodle soups
Singaporean noodle dishes